Jack Holmes may refer to:

 Jack Holmes (rugby league, born 1904) (1904–1931), Australian rugby league footballer of the 1920s and 1930s
 Jack Holmes (rugby league, born 1994), rugby league footballer of the 2010s
 Jack Holmes (cricketer) (1899–1950), English cricketer
 Jack Holmes (American football) (born 1953), NFL player

See also
John Holmes (disambiguation)